The Bangladesh A cricket team toured Ireland to play 5 Unofficial ODIs and 3 Unofficial T20s in August 2018.

The List-A series was drawn 2–2. Bangladesh A won the T20 series 2–1.

Squads

List A series

1st Unofficial ODI

2nd Unofficial ODI

3rd Unofficial ODI

4th Unofficial ODI

5th Unofficial ODI

T20 series

1st Unofficial T20

2nd Unofficial T20

3rd Unofficial T20

Notes

References 

A team cricket
2018 in Bangladeshi cricket
2018 in Irish cricket
International cricket tours of Bangladesh